Eric Francis (17 June 1894 – 25 August 1983) was a rugby union player who represented Australia.

Francis, a wing, was born in Ipswich, Queensland and claimed a total of 2 international rugby caps for Australia.

References

                   

Australian rugby union players
Australia international rugby union players
1894 births
1983 deaths
Rugby union players from Ipswich, Queensland
Rugby union wings